Nancy Zafris is an American novelist and short story writer.

She has won individual artist's grants, from the Massachusetts Arts Council, the Greater Columbus Arts Council, and the Ohio Arts Council. She was a senior Fulbright fellow, and taught at Masaryk University . She has taught at the University of Pittsburgh, Centre College, and Ohio State University.

Her work has appeared in Antioch Review, Alaska Quarterly Review, Black Warrior Review, Story Quarterly, and Wind. She is the former fiction editor of Kenyon Review and series editor for the Flannery O'Connor award. She lives in Columbus, Ohio.

Awards
 Two-time winner of the National Endowment for the Arts grant
 1990 Flannery O'Connor Award for Short Fiction, for The People I Know

Works
"Travel" Smoke Long Quarterly
The Metal Shredders BlueHen Books (2002) 
Lucky Strike Unbridled Books (2005) 
"After Lunch" Prairie Schooner Winter 2007
The People I Know University of Georgia Press, 2009,

References

External links
"Smoking With Nancy Zafris", SmokeLong Quarterly, March 15, 2007
"Interview with Nancy Zafris", Emerging Writers Forum
Kenyon Review
Prairie Schooner archives

American women novelists
American women short story writers
Year of birth missing (living people)
Living people
University of Pittsburgh faculty
Centre College faculty
Ohio State University faculty
Academic staff of Masaryk University
20th-century American novelists
20th-century American women writers
20th-century American short story writers
Kentucky women writers
Novelists from Pennsylvania
Novelists from Ohio
Novelists from Kentucky
American women academics
21st-century American women